Sheridan Downtown Commercial Historic District is a national historic district located at Sheridan, Hamilton County, Indiana.   It encompasses 38 contributing buildings and 1 contributing structure in the central business district of Sheridan. It developed between about 1880 and 1939, and includes notable examples of Italianate and Romanesque Revival style architecture. Notable buildings include the H.J. Thistlethwaite Building (1886), Carnegie library, First Christian Church (1910-1911), Higbee Buggy Company, American State Bank (1914), Stanley Brothers Building (c. 1895), Slliot's Drugstore (c. 1913), Indiana Telephone Company building (c. 1910), and U.S. Post Office (1939-1940).

It was listed on the National Register of Historic Places in 2007.

References

Historic districts on the National Register of Historic Places in Indiana
Romanesque Revival architecture in Indiana
Italianate architecture in Indiana
Historic districts in Hamilton County, Indiana
National Register of Historic Places in Hamilton County, Indiana